A tourist bus carrying 50 passengers, mostly students from Bestlink College of the Philippines in Quezon City who were on a field trip, lost its brakes and crashed into an electricity pole in Tanay, Rizal, killing 15 passengers including the driver. The accident uncovered lax regulations on safety of students on educational trips in the Philippines and prompted the Commission on Higher Education and Department of Education to issue moratoriums on field trips for the 2016–17 school year.

Accident
A tourist bus (no. 8), operated by Panda Coach Tours and Transport Inc., transporting around 50 college students from Bestlink College of the Philippines who are in the field trip destined to a camping site in Rizal. According to Erwin Gascon of the Tanay police station, the bus was travelling to Sitio Bayucal in Barangay Sampaloc in Tanay, Rizal when it lost its brakes and bumped into the electricity pole around 8:45 am, killing 15 passengers (13 students and a teacher) and including a driver named Julian Lacorda Jr. in the process, and injuring about 40 others. One passenger later died in a hospital a day after the accident. The town government said that the bus driver deliberately hit the post as the braking method. The impact of the crash tearing the roof of the bus and toppling the post. Moments before the accident, passengers allegedly noticed the smell of burning rubber. However, the bus driver apparently ignored them.

In an interview with DZMM, the bus representative, Johna Martires, said the company had already issued their insurance firm to take care of the needs of the victims.

Aftermath
A day after the accident, the Commission on Higher Education imposed a moratorium on field trips and educational tours in all education levels to give the investigation of the accident. A proposal made by Commissioner Prospero de Vera III to disable field trips in private and public colleges and universities until the investigation is made. The Land Transportation Franchising and Regulatory Board (LTFRB) is set to suspend the operations of the bus company which is involved in an accident. The Department of Education (DepEd) announced on February 22 that it will issue a moratorium on all levels until June 2017 following the accident. It is revealed that another survivor said that the bus no. 8 was a substitute of Harana Tours bus that was initially assigned to them.

Senators Tito Sotto and Bam Aquino sought a Senate investigation into accidents, finding to ensure the safety of the commuters amid road accidents.

Months after the accident, the Tourism Department called on academic institutions to arrange field trips only with DOT-accredited tour service providers.

Reaction
Actresses Denise Laurel and Carmi Martin expressed sadness over the deaths of the bus accident. Laurel and Martin claimed to have encountered the bus pass by before the accident and waved to the students while filming for their upcoming television series, The Better Half, in Tanay. In her Instagram post, Laurel quoted:

References

Tanay bus accident
Bus incidents in the Philippines
Tanay bus accident
History of Rizal
Tanay bus accident